Abimbola Adunni Adelakun (born 15 September) is a Nigerian writer.

Biography
Born in Ibadan, SouthWest Nigeria, she was educated at the University of Ibadan, where she graduated with a bachelor's degree and a Master of Arts degree in communication and language arts. She graduated as a Ph.D. holder in dance and theater at the University of Texas, Austin.

She works with The Punch newspaper in Lagos, Nigeria, as a writer. She studied modern African culture as they are lived and performed through the disciplinary lenses of performance, gender, Africana, and Yoruba studies. She writes academic articles which have been published in different journals including the Journal of Women and Religion, and Journal of Culture and African Women Studies. Some of her articles include ‘Coming to America: Race, Class, Nationality and Mobility in “African” hip  hop’ 2013; Pentecostal Panopticism and the Phantasm of “The Ultimate Power” 2018; ‘The Spirit Names the Child: Pentecostal Names and Trans-ethics’ 2020; ‘Black Lives Matter! Nigerian Lives Matter!: Language and Why Black Performance Matters’ 2019; ‘Pastocracy: Performing Pentecostal politics in Africa’ 2018; ‘Godmentality: Pentecostalism as performance in Nigeria’ 2017; ‘The Ghosts of Performance Past: Theatre, Gender, Religion and Cultural Memory’ 2017; ‘Spectacular Prophecies: Examining Pentecostal Power in Africa’ 2017; ‘Remixing Religion: An Interdisciplinary Graduate Student Conference’ 2014; ‘Yoruba Studies Review’ and ‘I am hated, therefore I am: The Enemy in Yorùbá Imaginary’

She is the author of the novel Under the Brown Rusted Roofs.

References

External links 
Under The Brown Rusted Roofs - review in Saraba Magazine
Nigerian writers' tour starts on a good note - Guardian

Year of birth missing (living people)
Living people
Nigerian women writers
University of Ibadan alumni
Writers from Ibadan
21st-century Nigerian writers